Courtland is a census-designated place in Sacramento County, California, United States. Courtland has a post office with ZIP code 95615, which was established in 1872. Courtland was named after Courtland Sims, son of James V. Sims, a landowner who opened a steamer landing in the community in 1870.

Geography
According to the United States Census Bureau, the CDP covers an area of 1.8 square miles (4.7 km2), all of it land.

Demographics

The 2010 United States Census reported that Courtland had a population of 355. The racial makeup of Courtland was 247 (69.6%) White, 0 (0.0%) African American, 6 (1.7%) Native American, 4 (1.1%) Asian, 0 (0.0%) Pacific Islander, 75 (21.1%) from other races, and 23 (6.5%) from two or more races. Hispanic or Latino of any race were 200 persons (56.3%).

The Census reported that 277 people (78.0% of the population) lived in households, 78 (22.0%) lived in non-institutionalized group quarters, and 0 (0%) were institutionalized.

There were 115 households, out of which 31 (27.0%) had children under the age of 18 living in them, 57 (49.6%) were opposite-sex married couples living together, 12 (10.4%) had a female householder with no husband present, 5 (4.3%) had a male householder with no wife present.  There were 7 (6.1%) unmarried opposite-sex partnerships, and 3 (2.6%) same-sex married couples or partnerships. 34 households (29.6%) were made up of individuals, and 18 (15.7%) had someone living alone who was 65 years of age or older. The average household size was 2.41.  There were 74 families (64.3% of all households); the average family size was 3.01.

The population was spread out, with 77 people (21.7%) under the age of 18, 38 people (10.7%) aged 18 to 24, 79 people (22.3%) aged 25 to 44, 95 people (26.8%) aged 45 to 64, and 66 people (18.6%) who were 65 years of age or older.  The median age was 41.1 years. For every 100 females, there were 102.9 males.  For every 100 females age 18 and over, there were 109.0 males.

The homeowner vacancy rate was 0%; the rental vacancy rate was 0%.  167 people (47.0% of the population) lived in owner-occupied housing units and 110 people (31.0%) lived in rental housing units.

Pear Fair
Courtland hosts the annual Pear Fair, celebrating the delta's Bartlett pear harvest, a tradition since 1972.  The 2020 Pear Fair was cancelled due to the Covid-19 crisis.

References

Census-designated places in Sacramento County, California
Populated places established in 1872
1872 establishments in California
Census-designated places in California
Populated places on the Sacramento River